January LaVoy (born in Trumbull, Connecticut) is an American actress and audiobook narrator. As an actress, she is most recognized as Noelle Ortiz on the ABC daytime drama One Life to Live. LaVoy made her Broadway debut in the Broadway premiere of the play Enron at the Broadhurst Theatre on April 27, 2010. 

As an audiobook narrator, she received five Audie Awards and been a finalist for nineteen. In 2013, she won Publishers Weekly's Listen Up Award for Audiobook Narrator of the Year. In 2019, AudioFile named her a Golden Voice narrator.

Personal life 
LaVoy married Mat Hostetler on September 4, 2011. They divorced in 2019, and she married fellow narrator and author Will Damron in 2022. They reside in Atlanta, GA.

Education 
LaVoy received her Bachelor of Arts degree in Theater from Fairfield University in Fairfield, Connecticut, where she was a member of Theatre Fairfield, the resident production company. She received her Master in Fine Arts degree from the National Theatre Conservatory at the Denver Center for the Performing Arts in Colorado.

Career

Theatre credits 
In the fall of 2012, LaVoy created the character of Lena in the world premiere of Pearl Cleage's What I Learned in Paris at the Alliance Theatre in Atlanta, Georgia. Her work has been seen in regional theatres across America, including the Denver Center Theatre Company, Pittsburgh's City Theatre and Public Theater, CATF in Shepherdstown, West Virginia, Philadelphia's Wilma Theater, and the Shakespeare Theatre of New Jersey. LaVoy played the character Risa in the 2007 Lucille Lortel Award-winning play, Two Trains Running. She received the 2004 Denver Post Ovation Award, as Best Actress, for her portrayal of Portia in the Denver Center Theatre Company's production of Shakespeare's The Merchant of Venice.

LaVoy played the role of Helen Keller in the play, Helen Keller Speaks, performed first on March 14, 2009, at the Regina A. Quick Center for the Arts at Fairfield University in Connecticut. The play was written by John Orman, a professor of politics at Fairfield University and a former teacher of LaVoy's. The play captures the social activist views of Keller based on her documented speeches and letters between 1913 and 1919.

LaVoy was featured in Signature Theatre Company's Off-Broadway production of Samm-Art Williams' Home playing Woman One/Pattie Mae Wells, as well as productions of Adrienne Kennedy's Funnyhouse of a Negro, and the world premiere of Will Eno's Wakey, Wakey alongside emmy winner Michael Emerson. She also performed in the world premiere of the musical Coraline at the MCC Theater. She shares a 2019 Lucille Lortel nomination for Outstanding Play with The Mad Ones, Phillip James Brannon, Brad Heberlee, and Carmen M. Herlihy. In 2022, LaVoy was nominated for two Helen Hayes awards -- Outstanding Lead Performer in a Play, and Outstanding Direction in a Play (co-nominated with Adam Immervahr) for her work in Anna Deavere Smith's Fires in the Mirror at Theater J.

Television and film credits 
In addition to her role on One Life to Live, LaVoy has been seen on Law & Order (including the SVU and Criminal Intent franchises), All My Children, Guiding Light, and 3 Lbs.. Guest star appearances include Elementary, NOS4A2, and Blue Bloods. She also appeared in Steven Spielberg's War of the Worlds and the short film High Ground.

Voiceover and audiobooks 
LaVoy has voiced many national commercials, including for Toll House, Revlon, Home Depot, Danone, and UnitedHealth Group.

In 2008, she recorded her first audiobook under a pseudonym because she feared the work may interfere with her roles on soap operas. Since then, she has recorded dozens of audiobooks for publishing houses such as Random House, Simon & Schuster, Hachette, Penguin Audio, and Macmillan Audio, including the following:

Awards and honors

Awards

"Best of" lists

References

External links
January LaVoy website

Year of birth missing (living people)
Living people
21st-century American women
21st-century American actresses
American soap opera actresses
Audiobook narrators
Fairfield University alumni
People from Trumbull, Connecticut